Surrey—Newton is a federal electoral district in British Columbia. It encompasses a portion of British Columbia previously included in the electoral districts of Fleetwood—Port Kells, Newton—North Delta and Surrey North.

Surrey—Newton was created by the 2012 federal electoral boundaries redistribution and was legally defined in the 2013 representation order. It came into effect upon the call of the 42nd Canadian federal election, which took place October 2015.

The riding takes its name from Newton, Surrey.

Demographics

Members of Parliament

This riding has elected the following members of the House of Commons of Canada:

Election results

Notes

References

British Columbia federal electoral districts
Federal electoral districts in Greater Vancouver and the Fraser Valley
Politics of Surrey, British Columbia